The Administrative Council for Economic Defense (in Portuguese, Conselho Administrativo de Defesa Econômica, often referred to as Cade or CADE) is Brazil's national competition regulator and an agency of the government of Brazil. Its stated goals are "guiding, inspecting, preventing and investigating economic power abuse by exercising a custodial role in its prevention and repression".

History 
On September 10, 1962 CADE was created as an organ of the Ministry of Labor during the government of President João Goulart by Law No. 4,137. From its creation until 1991, it remained largely inactive being used as an instrument of the State. 

Law No. 8,884, of June 11, 1994, revoked Law No. 4,137 and transformed CADE into a federal agency linked to the Ministry of Justice.

In November 2011, Law No. 12,529 was approved, entering into force in May 2012. This law made numerous changes in the autarchy, especially from an organizational and procedural perspective.

Structure 
CADE's main bodies are the Administrative Court (TADE), the General Superintendence (SG) and the Department of Economic Studies (DEE). TADE has the role of judging competition matters, playing preventive, repressive and educational roles within the Brazilian market. The SG mainly plays the role of instructing the processes in the control of conducts and concentrations and of monitoring the market. DEE prepares economic studies in order to assist TADE and SG.

Similar institutions with equivalent functions to those of CADE are the Federal Trade Commission (FTC) in the United States of America, the Office of Fair Trading (OFT) in the United Kingdom, the Italian Competition Authority, the Australian Competition & Consumer Commission (ACCC) in Australia.

References

See also
List of regulatory organs of Brazil
List of former presidents of Cade

Competition regulators
Government agencies of Brazil
Regulation in Brazil
Consumer organisations in Brazil